Adrian White is a Canadian drummer.

In 1994, White played drums on the first album from Devin Townsend's newly founded Strapping Young Lad Heavy as a Really Heavy Thing as well as co writing and demo recording the majority of Strapping Young Lad City. Shortly after he toured with Front Line Assembly (FLA) on the Hard Wired Tour in 1995–96 recording the Live Wired concert tour video and album.
In 2000, Adrian rejoined FLA for more touring in Europe and the WGT Festival leaving the band in 2006 after the Artificial Soldier tour. In 2003 he pulled double duty, joining FLA side-projects Delerium and Conjure One for a sold-out North American tour.

On 17 December 2010, Reset announced the return of Adrian White with the band at the same time they announced a concert to celebrate its 15th year of existence.  
In 2014, White joined the Canadian hardcore punk band SNFU for its Canadian and European touring. In 2018, Adrian White began playing drums for Men Without Hats, doing a Canadian tour in 2018 and a 38-date tour in the USA in 2019.

Discography
 Strapping Young Lad – Heavy as a Really Heavy Thing (1995) (Session Drums)
 Strapping Young Lad – City (1997) Drums arrangements (additional) (track 6)
 Front Line Assembly – Live Wired (1995)
 Punky Brüster - Cooked on Phonics (1996)
 Reset – No Limits (1998); re-release No Worries/No Limits (2006)
 Conjure One – live (2003)
 Aerodrone – Spin EP (2006)
 Dismantled – Standard Issue (2006)
 Front Line Assembly – Artificial Soldier (2006)
 Front Line Assembly - Fallout (2007)

References

External links

 http://www.myspace.com/thesilentalarm

Year of birth missing (living people)
Living people
Place of birth missing (living people)
Canadian industrial musicians
Slaveco. members
Reset (Canadian band) members
Strapping Young Lad members